Panagia is one of the titles of Mary, the mother of Jesus, in Eastern Orthodox Christianity.

Panagia or Panaghia may also refer to:

Panagia
places in Greece and Cyprus:
Panagia, Paphos, a village in Cyprus
Panagia, Chalkidiki a village in Chalkidiki, Greece
Panagia, Grevena a village in Grevena, Greece
Panagia, Lemnos, a village on the island of Lemnos, Greece
Panagia, an island in the Ionian Sea, Greece
Panagia, Thasos, a village on the island of Thasos in northern Greece
Kyra Panagia, an island in the Sporades, Aegean Sea, Greece
Panagia, also known as Pasas, an island in Oinousses, Aegean Sea, Greece

Panaghia
Panaghia, a village in Calopăr Commune, Dolj County, Romania 
, a Greek cargo ship in service 1970-75